Skepperiella is a genus of fungus in the family Marasmiaceae. The widespread genus contains four species.
The genus was circumscribed by Albert Pilát in Bull. Soc. Mycol. France vol.43 on page 56 in 1927.

The genus name of Skepperia is in honour of Edmund Skepper (1825–1867), who was a British botanist and chemist.

Species
As accepted by Species Fungorum;
 Skepperiella cochlearis 
 Skepperiella merulioides  
 Skepperiella populi 
 Skepperiella spathularia

See also

List of Marasmiaceae genera

References

Marasmiaceae
Agaricales genera